Smartdrive may refer to:
SmartDrive, a disk caching program that shipped with MS-DOS
SmartDrive Systems, a vehicle telematics company in San Diego, CA